Marthanda Varma Sankaran Valiathan (born 24 May 1934) is an Indian cardiac surgeon. He is a former President of the Indian National Science Academy and National Research Professor of the Government of India.

He was awarded the Padma Vibushan in 2005 for his contributions to health technology in India. He was made a Chevalier in the Ordre des Palmes Académiques, an honour bestowed by the French government, in 1999. He received the Dr. Samuel P. Asper International 
Award from the Johns Hopkins University Medical School in 2009 for his contributions to international medical education.

Early life and education
He was born to Marthanda Varma and Janaki Varma in 1934. His early education was at a government school in Mavelikara, followed by the University College, Trivandrum. Valiathan's medical education took place at the Medical College, Trivandrum, University of Kerala, where he obtained his M B B S degree(1951-1956). He later went to the University of Liverpool in Liverpool, England as a surgical trainee and received his fellowship from the Royal College of Surgeons of Edinburgh and England in 1960 and master's degree in surgery from the University of Liverpool. After a brief stint as a faculty member at the Post Graduate Institute of Medical Education and Research, Chandigarh he underwent further training in cardiac surgery at the Johns Hopkins, George Washington, and Georgetown University Hospitals, USA. He worked as a Fellow of Doctors Vincent Gott at the Hopkins and Charles Hufnagel at the Georgetown University  He was also granted the fellowship of the Royal College of Physicians and Surgeons of Canada in cardiovascular surgery in 1970.

Academic career
He has served on the faculty of the Georgetown University Hospital, Post Graduate Institute of Medical Education and Research, Indian Institute of Technology, Madras and as director of Sree Chitra Thirunal Institute of Medical Sciences and Technology. Subsequently, Valiathan became the first Vice-Chancellor of Manipal University in 1994.

Sree Chitra Tirunal Institute (1974–1994)
In 1972, Valiathan returned to India and had an uncertain beginning at the Safdarjung Hospital in New Delhi. Soon after he moved to Indian Institute of Technology Madras where his responsibility was teaching with low priority for research. Several friends and colleagues, including Dr. Hufnagel wondered whether he had made a foolish mistake in opting to leave the United States. However he received an invitation from the Government of Kerala where the Chief Minister, Shri Achutha Menon, asked him to develop a hospital for specialities in the new, unoccupied building of Sree Chitra Tirunal Center, Trivandrum, and gave him freedom and authority to accomplish the task. The hospital was set up in two years and patients with cardiovascular and neurologic diseases admitted for treatment. Simultaneously the development of cardiovascular devices was initiated with the support of the Science and Engineering Research Council of the Government of India. As Sree Chitra Institute grew, it received support from prime minister Morarji Desai and was notified as "An Institution of National Importance" by an Act of Parliament within five years of Dr. Valiathan's leadership.

Chitra valve development

In 1975, the demand for prosthetic valves was high in the hospital, which could not be met by imported valves in view of prohibitive cost. The state of Kerala had but one licensed abattoir at that time in Koothattukulam, which slaughtered less than 200 pigs per month and made porcine valve development unviable. As autopsies were much fewer, homograft valve development was even less viable. Under these circumstances, Dr. Valiathan and his team opted to develop a mechanical valve of tilting-disc design. The currently marketed Chitra-TTK valve is the fourth model in a series that was developed over a decade of effort.

In the first model, the major and minor struts were electron beam welded and the valve was expected to withstand 360 million cycles of disc movement. Unfortunately, the major strut fractured at the weld after a mere 100,000 cycles due to weld embrittlement.  In the second model, the disk was made of single crystal sapphire which was inert and blood compatible. The housing was carved out of a block of titanium. This model failed as well because of extensive wear of titanium struts and escape of the disc. The third model had a housing made of a highly wear- resistant superalloy, "Haynes-25", a cobalt based alloy of chromium, nickel and tungsten. This model went through all the tests successfully and several sheep with the implanted valve were alive and well for months until the death of one animal at 3 months after valve implantation. Necropsy showed that the sapphire disc had fractured and caused the death of the animal. This was a major setback in the quest for a cheap, local made heart valve However the fourth model was a success and more than 100,000 valves have been implanted in patients (till 2016).The multidisciplinary team at the Sree Chitra Institute led by Dr.Valiathan also developed a vascular graft and a series of disposable devices such as blood bag, oxygenator and cardiotomy reservoir, which are in commercial production in industrial units in Kerala and Tamil Nadu.

Vice Chancellor
After about twenty years at Sri Chitra, Dr. Valiathan became the vice-chancellor of the newly set up Manipal University (then MAHE, Manipal Academy of Higher Education). He held this office till 1999.

Books on Ayurvedia pioneers

In the year 1999, he was awarded a Senior Fellowship by the Homi Bhabha Council to pursue a study of Caraka, which culminated in the publication a book "The Legacy of Caraka". Later on, as a National Research Professor, he carried out a study of Sushruta and Vagbhata and completed the series of Legacy volumes on the ` Great Three' of Ayurveda.

In an interview, Dr. Valiathan had observed, "At this time there is no common ground where physicists, chemists, immunologists and molecular biologists can interact with Ayurvedic physicians.  Ayurveda is not only the mother of medicine but also of all life sciences in India. In spite of it, science has been completely divorced from Ayurveda... But these are the interdisciplinary areas where advances will take place."
Earlier in another article, he had written, "To ignore the testimony of thousands of patients over many decades is reminiscent of the derisive attitude of Edward Jenner's contemporaries in Gloucestershire who despised the claim of milkmaids that cow pox gave them protection from small pox! When Jenner wrote to his mentor John Hunter on the observed facts and the arguments against it, Hunter gave his famous reply, "Why think? Why not experiment?". That applies to Ayurveda whose time to experiment has arrived.

Research in basic sciences

Currently, Dr. Valiathan is engaged in promoting research in basic sciences, based on cues from Ayurvedic concepts and procedures. The research in prominent institutes is being supported by government funding in "A Science Initiative in Ayurveda" (ASIIA). In his report, during the seventeenth meeting of the Scientific Advisory Committee to the Cabinet (SAC-C) in 2009, under the Chairmanship of Dr. R. Chidambaram,
Principal Scientific Adviser to the Government of India, Dr. Valiathan lauded the support of the Indian government while presenting an update on ongoing projects. ASIIA made good progress and has been taken over by the Department of Science and Technology, Government of India, for sustained support under a "Task Force in Ayurvedic Biology", which appears on the SERB website. He has also given a course of video lectures on ` The Ayurvedic Inheritance of India ' under the NPTEL programme of the IITs of India. These lectures provided the material for his book ` Ayurvedic Inheritance; A Reader's Companion'published by Manipal University Press in 2017.

Awards and honours

Dr.Valiathan's contributions to medical sciences and technology have brought him many honours and awards such as the Fellowships of the Indian Academy of Sciences, Indian National Science Academy, National Academy of Sciences, India, National Academy of Medical Sciences, Indian National Academy of Engineering, The World Academy of Sciences, American College of Cardiology, the Royal College of Physicians of London and the International Union of Societies of Biomaterials and Engineering.  He is a Hunterian Professor of the Royal College of Surgeons of England and a Senior Member of the Society of Thoracic Surgeons of the United States and the Society of Cardiothoracic Surgeons of Great Britain. The French Government has honoured him by making him a Chevalier in the order of Palmes Académiques. He is a recipient of many Awards for Science, Technology and Education, which include the R.D. Birla Award, O.P. Bhasin Award, Jawaharlal Nehru Award, Dhanwantari Prize, Aryabhata medal, Basanti Devi Amirchand Prize, J.C. Bose medal, Kerala State Science and Technology Award, B.C. Guha Award, Pinnamaneni Foundation Award, Sat Pal Mittal Award, G.M. Modi Award, M. V. Pylee Award, H.K. Firodia Award and the Sastra Puraskaram of the Kerala Government. He received the Dr. Samuel P. Asper International Award from the Johns Hopkins University, USA for his contributions to medical education. 

Professor Valiathan served on numerous Government committees and academic councils which pertain to education, medicine, science and technology.  These include, among many others, the University Grants Commission, Indian Council of Medical Research, Science and Engineering Research Council of the DST, Atomic Energy Regulatory Board and the Science Advisory Committee to the Cabinet. He was the Chairman of the Committee on Bioethics of the Indian Council of Medical Research and was previously the Chairman of the State Committee for Science, Technology and Environment of the Government of Kerala. He is a past President of the Association of Indian Universities.

Valiathan has received numerous honorary degrees, fellowships and awards

 Honorary Fellow Indian College of Cardiology
 Delhi University in Delhi (D.Sc.)
 Banaras Hindu University in Varanasi (D.Sc.)
 Indira Gandhi National Open University in New Delhi (D.Sc.)
 Kanpur University in Kanpur (D.Sc.)
 Bengal Engineering and Science University in Sibpur (D.Sc.)
 Panjab University in Chandigarh (D.Sc.)
 TransDisciplinary University in Bangalore (D.Litt) February 2021.
Honorary Fellow, Kerala Academy of Sciences
 Hyderabad University in Hyderabad (D.Sc.)
 Institute of Liver and Biliary Sciences in New Delhi ( D. Sc.) February 2018
  Padma Vibhushan in 2005.
 Padma Bhushan in 1990
 Jawaharlal Nehru Tropical Botanic Garden and Research Institute, Trivandrum named a new hybrid in their Orchid Breeding Programme Paphiopedilum M S Valiathan in his honour. Paphiopedilum M S Valiathan is registered with the International Register of Orchid Hybrids ( Sander's list ) 114:1270 ( July — Aug 2006)
A new R & D facility named M S Valiathan Medical Devices Engineering Block was inaugurated by Union Minister Dr Harsh Vardhan at the Sree Chitra Institute, Trivandrum on 16 May 2015

Bibliography

Valiathan, M S.( 2012).Vagbhatapaithrukam.( Tr.into Malayalam of Legacy of Vagbhata).DCBooks.
Valiathan M S.(2017) Ayurvedic Inheritance- A Reader's Companion. Manipal University Press

References

Living people
1934 births
Medical doctors from Thiruvananthapuram
Malayali people
University of Kerala alumni
Alumni of the University of Liverpool
Manipal Academy of Higher Education alumni
Indian cardiac surgeons
Recipients of the Padma Vibhushan in medicine
Recipients of the Padma Shri in medicine
Recipients of the Padma Bhushan in medicine
Chevaliers of the Ordre des Palmes Académiques
Fellows of the Royal College of Surgeons of Edinburgh
Fellows of the Royal College of Surgeons
Fellows of the Royal College of Physicians
Fellows of the Indian Academy of Sciences
Fellows of the Indian National Science Academy
Fellows of The National Academy of Sciences, India
Fellows of the National Academy of Medical Sciences
20th-century Indian medical doctors
20th-century surgeons